Maloni Bole (born 22 November 1968) is a Fijian sprinter. He competed in the men's 100 metres at the 1988 Summer Olympics.

References

External links

1968 births
Living people
Athletes (track and field) at the 1988 Summer Olympics
Fijian male sprinters
Olympic athletes of Fiji
Commonwealth Games competitors for Fiji
Athletes (track and field) at the 1986 Commonwealth Games
Place of birth missing (living people)